Johann Chapuis (born 15 January 1975) is a retired French footballer who played as a defender.

Career
Chapuis made 177 appearances in Ligue 2, and he helped three clubs gain promotion from the Championnat National to Ligue 2. His previous clubs include AS Nancy Lorraine, Louhans-Cuiseaux, FC Rouen and Stade Lavallois.

Honours
Chamois Niortais

 Championnat National champions: 2005–06

References
General
 
 
 
Specific

1975 births
Living people
Sportspeople from Besançon
French footballers
Association football defenders
Racing Besançon players
AS Nancy Lorraine players
Louhans-Cuiseaux FC players
FC Rouen players
ASOA Valence players
Chamois Niortais F.C. players
Stade Lavallois players
US Créteil-Lusitanos players
Jura Sud Foot players
Ligue 2 players
Championnat National players
Footballers from Bourgogne-Franche-Comté